The Ounasjoki is the Kemijoki's largest tributary and is Finland's longest single river tributary. It is also the largest river entirely within its borders.

Course
The Ounasjoki originates at Ounasjärvi lake in Enontekiö. It flows first eastwards through Periläjärvi lake and turns south after some seven kilometres. The river then follows southern-southeasterly course until its confluence with the Kemijoki at Rovaniemi.

Tributaries

Left
 Näkkäläjoki
 Käkkälöjoki
 Syvä Tepastojoki
 Loukinen
 Meltausjoki

Right
 Marrasjoki

Fauna
Grayling, trout, pike and other fish typical to northern Finland are found in the Ounasjoki.

References

External links

Kemijoki basin
Rivers of Finland
Rivers of Enontekiö
Rivers of Kittilä
Rivers of Rovaniemi